This Girl's in Love is the sixth studio album by Australian singer-songwriter Gyan, released on 26 October 2015. The album consists of cover versions of songs by John Lennon, Neil Young, Kate Bush and Tom Waits as well as a re-recording of her own 1989 single, "Wait".

The album was a result of a successful Kickstarter campaign which raised over $25,000 to make the record.

Critical reception
Noel Mengel of news.com.au wrote "Gyan is in sparklingly good voice and the understated small orchestra arrangements she uses frequently here are ravishing" calling Gyan an "underrated Australian talent".

Track listing 
 "Johnny Guitar"
 "The First Time Ever I Saw Your Face"
 "Jealous Guy"
 "Moon River"
 "What'll I Do?"
 "Alfie"
 "Tumbleweed"
 "The Man with the Child in His Eyes"
 "Un Homme Et Une Femme"
 "Oh My Love"
 "Wait #2"
 "I'm Still Here"

References

2015 albums
Gyan Evans albums